Eric Shane Reed (born December 2, 1980) is a former Major League Baseball outfielder who played for the Florida Marlins in 2006 and 2007.

Amateur career
A native of Little Rock, Arkansas, Reed attended Monticello High School in Monticello, Arkansas where he was a letterman in football, baseball, and powerlifting, and garnered all-state honors in both football and baseball. He attended Texas A&M University, and in 2001 he played collegiate summer baseball with the Wareham Gatemen of the Cape Cod Baseball League, where he was named a league all-star and won the league's Thurman Munson Award for leading all hitters with a .365 batting average. Reed was drafted in the 9th round of the 2002 Major League Baseball Draft by the Florida Marlins.

Professional career
Reed made his Major League Baseball debut with the Florida Marlins on April 3, 2006, against the Houston Astros. He started the season 4-for-35 (.114) with three stolen bases and was optioned to Triple-A Albuquerque on May 17. On May 19, 2008, Reed signed a minor league contract with the New York Mets and was assigned to Double-A Binghamton, but was released in early July.

References

External links

1980 births
Living people
Baseball players from Arkansas
Major League Baseball center fielders
Florida Marlins players
Texas A&M Aggies baseball players
Sportspeople from Little Rock, Arkansas
Jamestown Jammers players
Jupiter Hammerheads players
Albuquerque Isotopes players
Carolina Mudcats players
Wareham Gatemen players